Nermin Useni (born 13 March 1980) is a Serbian former professional footballer who played as a midfielder.

Honours
Mladost Lučani
 Serbian First League: 2006–07
Rudar Pljevlja
 Montenegrin First League: 2009–10
 Montenegrin Cup: 2009–10, 2010–11

External links
 
 

Association football midfielders
Expatriate footballers in Montenegro
First League of Serbia and Montenegro players
FK Hajduk Kula players
FK Javor Ivanjica players
FK Mladost Lučani players
FK Radnički Beograd players
FK Radnički Obrenovac players
FK Rudar Pljevlja players
Gorani people
Kosovo Serbs
Montenegrin First League players
OFK Mladenovac players
People from Prizren
Serbia and Montenegro footballers
Serbian expatriate footballers
Serbian expatriate sportspeople in Montenegro
Serbian First League players
Serbian footballers
Serbian SuperLiga players
1980 births
Living people